A Tiêng is a rural commune of Tây Giang District, Quảng Nam Province, Vietnam.

References

Populated places in Quảng Nam province
District capitals in Vietnam